The 2016 Hastings Borough Council election took place on 5 May 2016 to elect members of Hastings Borough Council in England. This was on the same day as other local elections.

See also

 2014 Hastings Borough Council election
 2012 Hastings Borough Council election
 2010 Hastings Borough Council election
 2008 Hastings Borough Council election

References

2016 English local elections
2016
2010s in East Sussex